The 1993 Connecticut Huskies football team represented the University of Connecticut in the 1993 NCAA Division I-AA football season.  The Huskies were led by eleventh year head coach Tom Jackson, and completed the season with a record of 6–5.

Schedule

References

Connecticut
UConn Huskies football seasons
Connecticut Huskies football